The Nashik district is under proposal to be divided and a separate Malegaon District be carved out of existing Nashik district with the inclusion of the north eastern parts of Nashik district which include Malegaon, Nandgaon, Deola, Baglan, and Kalwan talukas, together with Chalisgaon Taluka from the neighbouring Jalgaon district.  in the proposed Malegaon district.

References

Nashik district
Proposed districts in Maharashtra
Nashik division